Larry James Patey (born March 19, 1953) is a Canadian former professional ice hockey player. Patey played twelve seasons in the National Hockey League between 1973–74 and 1984–85 with the California Golden Seals, St. Louis Blues, and New York Rangers. Larry is the brother of NHLer Doug Patey.

Playing career
Patey was drafted 130th overall by the Golden Seals in the 1973 NHL Amateur Draft. As a pro rookie, he won the 1973–74 Western League Rookie Award. He played 717 career NHL games (over 600 of them with the Blues), scoring 153 goals and 316 points with 631 penalty minutes. In 1980–81, Patey scored eight shorthanded goals, which is a Blues team record.

Personal life
Born in Toronto, he was raised in Port Credit, now part of Mississauga. He is now a real estate agent based in Chesterfield, Missouri.

Career statistics

Regular season and playoffs

References

External links

1953 births
Living people
California Golden Seals draft picks
California Golden Seals players
Canadian ice hockey centres
New England Whalers draft picks
New Haven Nighthawks players
New York Rangers players
Salt Lake Golden Eagles (WHL) players
Sportspeople from Mississauga
Ice hockey people from Toronto
St. Louis Blues players